Denmark is an unincorporated community and census-designated place in northeastern Lee County, Iowa, United States. It lies along Iowa Highway 16, north of the city of Fort Madison, the county seat of Lee County. Although Denmark is unincorporated, it has a post office with the ZIP code of 52624, that opened on April 7, 1846. The town also has a branch of Farmers Savings Bank that opened in 1935. The community is part of the Fort Madison–Keokuk, IA-MO Micropolitan Statistical Area. As of the 2020 census, its population was 425.

Denmark was laid out circa 1837.

Demographics

History
In 1836, four families emigrated from the town and church of New Ipswich, NH to Denmark in what was then Wisconsin Territory, now in Iowa. Within a short time they were followed by eight other families. They all carried with them the same standard of right living and wise planning for the best interest of those who should come after them that they had known in New Ipswich. Those who "laid out the town of Denmark, which is three-fourths of a mile square, into town lots for building, donated one-half of those lots to the purpose of Education." In the building of a church and of an academy they followed as closely as possible the example set by the founders of New Ipswich. The church set up by the settlers is the oldest Congregational church in Iowa. They were early known as champions of freedom. "Under the leadership of their pastor, Rev. Asa Turner, they joined with others in the election of Governor Grimes in 1854, which changed the political history of Iowa and gave birth to the Republican party in the nation." Dr. Turner and Rev. Mr. Lee were classmates at Yale College and lifelong friends. His pastorate continued for thirty years; and his influence led to Iowa the eleven young men from Andover Seminary who formed the "Iowa Band," one of whom, their historian, was Rev. Ephraim Adams, a son of New Ipswich.

Education
The Fort Madison Community School District serves Denmark, operating Lincoln and Richardson elementary schools, Fort Madison Middle School, and Fort Madison High School.

Previously the district operated Denmark Elementary School in Denmark; in 1998 the school had about 305 students. It originated from the establishment of Denmark Academy in 1845. The original building was destroyed in a fire circa 1924. The district decided to demolish Denmark Elementary in 2012. Ken Marang, the superintendent, stated that the "outdated" building had problems with mold and water leakage and that the fact that "doors open out into the hallways" made it "unsafe". Circa 2013 some residents were calling for the school to be dismantled and the land given to the community.

Notable people
Frank Leverett, geologist, was born near Denmark.
Catharine Van Valkenburg Waite, women's suffrage activist, author, and lawyer, lived in Denmark as a child.
Ephraim Adams, town founder, missionary, minister, abolitionist, early founder and President of the board of Trustees for Iowa College. Moved to Denmark in 1843, at 25 years old.

See also
Denmark Congregational United Church of Christ, listed on the National Register of Historic Places in Iowa

References

Unincorporated communities in Lee County, Iowa
Unincorporated communities in Iowa
Fort Madison–Keokuk, IA-IL-MO Micropolitan Statistical Area